Chalmeh Kandi (also Romanized as Chālmeh Kandī; also known as Chalmā, Chalmā Kandī, Chalmā Kendī, and Chālmeh) is a village in Qeshlaq-e Sharqi Rural District, Qeshlaq Dasht District, Bileh Savar County, Ardabil Province, Iran. At the 2006 census, its population was 734, in 140 families.

References 

Towns and villages in Bileh Savar County